Motown: The Musical is a jukebox musical that premiered on Broadway in April 2013.  The musical is based on Berry Gordy's autobiography To Be Loved: The Music, the Magic, the Memories of Motown (1994), and on the history of his founding and running of the Motown record label, and his personal and professional relationships with Motown artists such as Diana Ross, Smokey Robinson, Marvin Gaye, and Michael Jackson. The production's music and lyrics are taken from selections from the Motown catalog. It received four nominations at the 67th Tony Awards.

Productions
Motown: The Musical premiered on Broadway, at the Lunt-Fontanne Theatre, on April 14, 2013, after previews starting on March 11. The production was directed by Charles Randolph-Wright, with choreography by Patricia Wilcox, scenic design by David Korins, costumes by ESosa, lighting by Natasha Katz, sound design by Peter Hylenski, and projection design by Daniel Brodie. Music supervision and arrangements were by Ethan Popp, with orchestrations by Ethan Popp and Bryan Crook.

The musical finished its original Broadway run on January 18, 2015, closing after 37 previews and 738 regular performances.

A national tour began in April 2014, featuring Clifton Oliver and Allison Semmes.

The show returned to Broadway on July 12, 2016, for an announced 18-week run at the Nederlander Theatre. However, the run closed earlier than expected, on July 31, 2016.

After speculation that a London production would be staged in the Dominion Theatre, which would be refurbished following the closure of We Will Rock You, an eventual West End production was announced in May 2015 for the Shaftesbury Theatre, which began on February 11, 2016, running until April 20, 2019. The West End production was directed by Charles Randolph-Wright, who also directed this musical on Broadway and its US tour. The cast stars Cedric Neal (as Berry Gordy), Lucy St. Louis (as Diana Ross), Sifiso Mazibuko (as Marvin Gaye), and Obioma Ugoala (as Smokey Robinson). A UK and Ireland tour began on October 11, 2018, at The Alexandra, Birmingham.

Synopsis
In 1983, at the Pasadena Civic Auditorium, recording stars are gathered to celebrate Motown Records' 25th anniversary. In a flashback, the young Berry Gordy watches the neighbors dancing in Detroit. In 1957, the adult Berry forms his own record label, and begins to make lifelong friends with recording artists/singers such as Marvin Gaye and Smokey Robinson. Berry discovers the Supremes and Diana Ross, among many others.

The recording stars sing their popular numbers, including: Diana Ross ("I Hear a Symphony", "You're Nobody till Somebody Loves You", and "You're All I Need to Get By"), Stevie Wonder, The Supremes ("Buttered Popcorn", "Where Did Our Love Go"), The Miracles ("Shop Around"), The Marvelettes ("Please Mr. Postman"), Mary Wells ("Bye Bye Baby"/"Two Lovers Medley"), The Temptations, Martha and the Vandellas ("Dancing in the Street"), The Contours ("Do You Love Me"), and The Jackson 5.

Original casts

Musical numbers
The musical contains a total of 66 songs. The following song list is not the order of the songs in the production:

Critical response
Charles Isherwood, in his review for The New York Times, wrote: "More than 50 songs...are performed in 'Motown,' usually, alas, in truncated versions. Most are simply presented as concert versions by the actors playing the artists who made them famous, but a few are shoehorned awkwardly into the story as 'book' songs.... Making way for so much music means that 'Motown' breezily scrimps on storytelling. Characters come and go so quickly we barely have time to register their famous names, let alone get to know them.... The performers put their songs across with verve and an admirable lack of self-consciousness, given that the audience is likely to be intimately familiar with every nuance of phrasing from the original recordings...."

The TheatreMania reviewer noted:

Rather than giving us a complex portrait on this fascinating businessman, the show's shoddily written book is essentially a self-serving theatrical memoir in which Gordy gets to tell his life story. But just as importantly, the piece also serves as a celebration of the music that brought America's black and white populations together in a way nothing else ever did. Perhaps that is why Gordy and his creative team, led by director Charles Randolph-Wright, seem so worried they left out an audience favorite that they crammed in more than 50 hits. The result is that too few of the beloved Motown classics receive the kind of full-scale, all-out renditions they deserve. An early, extended version of Martha & The Vandellas' 'Dancing in the Street' proves not just a high point (abetted by energetic choreography from Patricia Wilcox and Warren Adams), but a false promise of what lies ahead....The one person who truly shines, though, is Valisia LeKae as Gordy's longtime paramour, superstar Diana Ross. It's not just her almost spot-on re-creation of Miss Ross' breathy voice and steely demeanor that commands our attention. The consistent display of her genuine star power — most evident in a thrilling 'Reach Out and Touch' segment — also draws us in.

Awards and nominations

Broadway production

References

External links
 
 Motown: The Musical - Official Site at motownthemusical.com

2013 musicals
Broadway musicals
West End musicals
Jukebox musicals
Motown
Motown artists